This page covers all the important events in the sport of tennis in 1996. Primarily, it provides the results of notable tournaments throughout the year on both the ATP and WTA Tours, the Davis Cup, and the Fed Cup.

ITF

Grand Slam events

Australian Open

Men's singles:  Boris Becker def.  Michael Chang, 6–2, 6–4, 2–6, 6–2
Women's singles:  Monica Seles def.  Anke Huber, 6–4, 6–1

French Open

Men's singles:  Yevgeny Kafelnikov def.  Michael Stich, 7–6(4), 7–5, 7–6(4)
Women's singles:  Steffi Graf def.  Gabriela Sabatini, 6–3, 6–7(4), 10–8

Wimbledon

Gentlemen's singles:  Richard Krajicek def.  MaliVai Washington, 6–3, 6–4, 6–3
Ladies' singles:  Steffi Graf def.  Arantxa Sánchez Vicario, 6–3, 7–5

US Open

Men's singles:  Pete Sampras def.  Michael Chang, 6–1, 6–4, 7–6
Women's singles:  Steffi Graf def.  Monica Seles, 7–5, 6–4

Davis Cup

World Group Draw

Final

Fed Cup

World Group Draw

Final

Olympics

Men's singles:  Andre Agassi def.  Sergi Bruguera, 6–2, 6–3, 6–1
Women's singles:  Lindsay Davenport def. Arantxa Sánchez Vicario, 7–6(6), 6–2

ATP Tour

ATP World Tour Finals

 Pete Sampras def.  Boris Becker, 3–6, 7–6(5), 7–6(4), 6–7(11), 6–4

WTA Tour

WTA Tour Championships

Singles:  Steffi Graf defeated  Martina Hingis 6–3, 4–6, 6–0, 4–6, 6–0

International Tennis Hall of Fame
Class of 1996:
Rosemary Casals, player
Dan Maskell, contributor

References

 
Tennis by year